Ormond is a novel by Maria Edgeworth published in June 1817. It tells the story of Harry Ormond, a hero who rises from poverty to wealth. Set both in Ireland and France, the novel uses different places to represent different paths that Ormond might take and different political ideologies. Ireland and France are shown as linked through their revolutionary fervour. In 1798, France had sent aid to the United Irishmen and this tie is hinted at through Ormond's travels. However, in the end Ormond chooses to serve in Britain's military, thus signalling Ireland's ties with England rather than its independence or its ties to France. The novel thematizes "obedience to tradition and culture", signifying these by allusions to Edmund Burke's Reflections on the Revolution in France (1790).

Notes

References
Connolly, Claire. "Introduction". Ormond. New York: Penguin, 2000. .

External links
  (in Tales and Novels — Volume 09)
 

1817 British novels
Novels by Maria Edgeworth
Novels set in Ireland
Novels set in France
19th-century Irish novels